Augustus Daniel Splivalo (May 24, 1840 – December 12, 1911) was an American politician and lawyer. In 1870, he was the first Italian American to serve in the California State Assembly. He was a prominent attorney and graduate of Santa Clara University.

His father was Stefano Splivalo, an Italian, born in Viganj, Croatia; and his mother was Teresa (née Balzano) Splivalo, also Italian, born in Livorno, Italy.

References

1840 births
1911 deaths
Santa Clara University alumni
Italian emigrants to the United States
Politicians from San Francisco
Burials at Holy Cross Cemetery (Colma, California)